The New Batman/Superman Adventures is a name given to a package series that combined Superman: The Animated Series with The New Batman Adventures produced by Warner Bros. Animation. It aired from 1997–2000 on Kids' WB. Each half-hour episode in the hour-and-one-half block featured either a single repeat from the original Superman: The Animated Series run, the original Batman: The Animated Series run, or a brand new story featuring Batman from The New Batman Adventures. These new stories focus more on Batman's supporting cast and introduced new characters such as Tim Drake. The two animated universes were united in the Superman episode "World's Finest", which tells the story of Batman and Superman's first meeting. The new Batman episodes that began airing in the Fall 1997 season were later released as a DVD box set of Batman: The Animated Series as Volume 4. New Superman episodes that later aired in the Fall 1998 season and onward are now considered to be the third season of Superman: The Animated Series.

Cast

Main cast

Regular villains

Recurring characters
 Bob Hastings – Commissioner Gordon
 Loren Lester – Dick Grayson / Nightwing
 Nicholle Tom – Kara In-Ze / Kara Kent / Supergirl
 Joseph Bologna – SCU Lt. Daniel "Dan" Turpin
 Mel Winkler – Lucius Fox
 George Dzundza – Perry White
 David Kaufman – James "Jimmy" Olsen

Recurring villains

Episodes

Note: These are the crossover episodes from the two series.

Feature film
 The Batman/Superman Movie: World's Finest (1997) – a direct-to-video compilation of three episodes that originally aired back-to-back-to-back as a single TV special during the second season of Superman: The Animated Series.

Accolades

See also

 World's Finest Comics
 World's Finest Team

References

External links
 

DC Animated Universe
Animated Batman television series
1990s American animated television series
2000s American animated television series
Animated Superman television series
Kids' WB original shows
1997 American television series debuts
2000 American television series endings
American children's animated action television series
American children's animated adventure television series
American children's animated superhero television series
Batman: The Animated Series
Superman: The Animated Series
Animated television shows based on DC Comics
Annie Award winners